Acanthocobitis (Paracanthocobitis) aurea also known as the barred zipper loach is a species of ray-finned fish in the genus, or subgenus, Paracanthocobitis. This species is known only from the type locality, the Narmada River at Jabalpur, state of Madhya Pradesh, India.

References

aurea
Fish described in 1872